There are 1682 localities in Moldova, including 66 urban localities (of them 53 are cities/towns, and 13 municipalities), and 1616 rural localities - villages. According to the Moldovan law on territorial administrative organisation, two or more villages can form together a commune.

This list is organized by district (or other first-tier administrative unit), and for each one it lists alphabetically all cities and communes. Unincorporated localities are listed under the cities and communes they belong to. The incorporated localities' territories cover the entire territory of the country.

Municipality of Chișinău
There are a total of 35 localities: 7 cities/towns (further containing 2 villages within), and 12 communes (containing a further 14 villages within):

Cities/towns

Communes

Municipality of Bălți
There are a total of 3 localities: 1 city, and 2 communes:

Cities/towns

Communes

Municipality of Bender (Tighina)
There are a total of 2 localities: 1 city, and 1 commune:

Cities/towns

Communes

Anenii Noi District
There are a total of 45 localities: 1 city (further containing 5 villages), and 25 communes (containing a further 14 villages):

Cities/towns

Communes

Basarabeasca District
There are a total of 10 localities: 1 city, and 6 communes (containing a further 3 villages within):

Cities/towns

Communes

Briceni District
There are a total of 39 localities: 2 cities, and 26 communes (containing a further 11 villages within):

Cities/towns

Communes

Cahul District
There are a total of 55 localities: 1 city (further containing 1 village), and 36 communes (containing a further 17 villages within):

Cities/towns

Communes

Cantemir District
There are a total of 51 localities: 1 city, and 26 communes (containing a further 24 villages within):

Cities/towns

Communes

Călărași District
There are a total of 44 localities: 1 city (further containing 1 village), and 27 communes (containing a further 15 villages within):

Cities/towns

Communes

Căușeni District
There are a total of 48 localities: 2 cities/towns (further containing 1 village), and 28 communes (containing a further 17 villages within):

Cities/towns

Communes

Cimișlia District
There are a total of 39 localities: 1 city (further containing 3 villages), and 22 communes (containing a further 13 villages within):

Cities/towns

Communes

Criuleni District
There are a total of 43 localities: 1 city (further containing 2 villages), and 24 communes (containing a further 16 villages within):

Cities/towns

Communes

Dondușeni District
There are a total of 30 localities: 1 city, and 21 communes (containing a further 8 villages within):

Cities/towns

Communes

Drochia District
There are a total of 40 localities: 1 city, and 27 communes (containing a further 12 villages within):

Cities/towns

Communes

Dubăsari District
There are a total of 15 localities: 11 communes (containing a further 4 villages within):

Cities/towns 
There are no cities in this district.

Communes

Edineț District
There are a total of 49 localities: 2 cities/towns (further containing 4 villages), and 30 communes (containing a further 13 villages within):

Cities/towns

Communes

Fălești District
There are a total of 76 localities: 1 city (further containing 1 village), and 32 communes (containing a further 42 villages within):

Cities/towns

Communes

Florești District
There are a total of 74 localities: 3 cities, and 37 communes (containing a further 34 villages within):

Cities/towns

Communes

Glodeni District
There are a total of 35 localities: 1 city (further containing 1 village), and 18 communes (containing a further 15 villages within):

Cities/towns

Communes

Hîncești District
There are a total of 63 localities: 1 city, and 38 communes (containing a further 24 villages within):

Cities/towns

Communes

Ialoveni District
There are a total of 34 localities: 1 city, and 24 communes (containing a further 9 villages within):

Cities/towns

Communes

Leova District
There are a total of 39 localities: 2 cities/towns (further containing 1 village), and 23 communes (containing a further 13 villages within):

Cities/towns

Communes

Nisporeni District
There are a total of 39 localities: 1 city, and 22 communes (containing a further 16 villages within):

Cities/towns

Communes

Ocnița District
There are a total of 33 localities: 3 cities, and 18 communes (containing a further 12 villages within):

Cities/towns

Communes

Orhei District
There are a total of 75 localities: 1 city, and 37 communes (containing a further 37 villages within):

Cities/towns

Communes

Rezina District
There are a total of 41 localities: 1 city (further containing 3 villages), and 24 communes (containing a further 13 villages within):

Cities/towns

Communes

Rîșcani District
There are a total of 55 localities: 2 cities/towns (further containing 6 villages), and 26 communes (containing a further 21 villages within):

Cities/towns

Communes

Sîngerei District
There are a total of 70 localities: 2 cities/towns (further containing 1 village), and 24 communes (containing a further 43 villages within):

Cities/towns

Communes

Soroca District
There are a total of 68 localities: 1 city, and 34 communes (containing a further 33 villages within):

Cities/towns

Communes

Strășeni District
There are a total of 39 localities: 2 cities/towns (further containing 2 village), and 25 communes (containing a further 10 villages within):

Cities/towns

Communes

Șoldănești District
There are a total of 33 localities: 1 city, and 22 communes (containing a further 10 villages within):

Cities/towns

Communes

Ștefan Vodă District
There are a total of 26 localities: 1 city, and 22 communes (containing a further 3 villages within):

Cities/towns

Communes

Taraclia District
There are a total of 26 localities: 2 cities, and 13 communes (containing a further 11 villages within):

Cities/towns

Communes

Telenești District
There are a total of 54 localities: 1 city (further containing 2 villages), and 30 communes (containing a further 21 villages within):

Cities/towns

Communes

Ungheni District
There are a total of 74 localities: 2 cities/towns (further containing 1 village), and 31 communes (containing a further 40 villages within):

Cities/towns

Communes

Găgăuzia
There are a total of 32 localities: 3 cities/towns (further containing 1 village within), and 23 communes (containing a further 5 villages within):

Cities/towns

Communes

Left Bank of the Dniester
According to the Moldovan law on territorial administrative organisation, on the Left Bank of the Dniester (today mostly in control of the unrecognized breakaway state of Transnistria), there are a total of 147 localities: 10 cities/towns (further containing 2 villages within), and 69 communes (containing a further 66 villages within):

Cities/towns

Communes

See also
 Administrative divisions of Moldova
 List of cities in Moldova
 Communes of Moldova

References

 List
Localities